Mirja is a given name. Notable people with the given name include:

Mirja Boes (born 1971), German comedian, actress, and singer
Mirja Breitholtz, Swedish songwriter and producer
Mirja Hietamies (1931–2013), Finnish cross-country skier
Mirja Jämes (1924–2020), Finnish former hurdler
Mirja Lehtonen (1942–2009), Finnish cross-country skier
Mirja Mane (1929–1974), Finnish actress
Mirja Ojanen (born 1967), Finnish ski-orienteering competitor
Mirja Puhakka (born 1955), Finnish ski-orienteering competitor
Mirja Turestedt (born 1972), Swedish actress
Mirja Vehkaperä (born 1976), Finnish politician

Finnish feminine given names